Vanilla Sky (also known as Service Air or AK-Air Georgia) is a privately owned airline headquartered in Tbilisi, Georgia and based at Natakhtari, that was founded in 2008. The airline is part of "Service Air" Company, subsidiary of Vanilla Sky International Tour Operator. Flights are subsidised by the state to increase mobility and tourism in Georgia with US$5.3 million as the reported amount that the airline was offered by the Georgian Airport Union.

Destinations
As of April 2019, Vanilla Sky serves the following scheduled destinations with additional charter services being on offer:

Georgia
Ambrolauri - Ambrolauri Airport
Batumi – Alexander Kartveli Batumi International Airport
Kutaisi - David the Builder Kutaisi International Airport
Mestia - Queen Tamar Airport
Tbilisi / Natakhtari - Natakhtari Airfield

Fleet
As of May 2020, Vanilla Sky (Service Air and AK-Air Georgia) operates the following aircraft:

Vanilla Sky previously operated a different Let L-410 (OK-PRH) on Mestia routes. The flight plan is regularly updated on the airline's Facebook page.

References

External links

Official website  
Service Air 

Airlines of Georgia (country)
Airlines established in 2008